Amina Njonkou (born 6 April 1988) is a Cameroonian female professional basketball player.

External links
Profile at eurobasket.com

1988 births
Living people
Cameroonian women's basketball players
Power forwards (basketball)